The Classic Christmas Album is the twenty-second studio album and second Christmas album by the American band Earth, Wind & Fire, released in 2015 by Sony/Legacy. It is essentially a reissue of their previous album Holiday with five bonus tracks. The album reached No. 34 on the Billboard Top R&B/Hip Hop Albums chart and No. 18 on the Billboard Top R&B Albums chart.

Critical reception

The album received favourable reviews from critics. Music critic Robert Christgau exclaimed "Why the hell not?"

Track listing

References

2015 Christmas albums
Earth, Wind & Fire albums
Albums produced by Philip Bailey
Albums produced by Maurice White
Sony Music albums
Legacy Recordings albums
Rhythm and blues Christmas albums
Christmas albums by American artists
Earth, Wind & Fire